Protocol holds that a head of state takes precedence over all other officials, 
and that heads of state rank in the order that they took office. The following list contains the heads of state for all United Nations member states and non-member observer states.

Commonwealth realms, other than the United Kingdom, each have a local governor-general appointed to represent the monarch in the realm's government. Governors-general are frequently accorded the status and privileges of a head of state at diplomatic events when considered as representing their absentee monarch, but not as themselves heads of state. The princes of Andorra each have a representative as well. Hereditary Prince Alois is permanent representative for exercising the sovereign powers due to Liechtenstein Prince Hans-Adam II. They are included in the list and are highlighted in blue.

However, in many cases it is not this neutral principle but national rules of protocol that are acted upon, usually by an international event's host nation, as in many bilateral and even certain multilateral occasions. Various international organisations have a system for internal use. Even in the presence of one or more Heads of State, certain occasions are governed by specific protocol, e.g. military. Thus in many cases precedence is given to monarchs over republican heads of state, mostly in monarchies; in some nations, the Pope (himself a monarchical head of state) ranks above secular heads of state, especially in Roman Catholic countries.

States recognised by the United Nations

Current

States with limited recognition

Current

Disputed governments 
The following heads of state represent governments that control part of their territory and/or are recognized as legitimate by at least one UN member state.

Current

See also
List of current heads of state and government
List of current state leaders by date of assumption of office
Order of precedence

Notes

References

State Heads of state by diplomatic precedence
Diplomatic precedence